Baroni is a village located in Tonk Tehsil of Tonk district, Rajasthan, India.

References

Villages in Tonk district